Louis Palmer (born 1971 in Budapest) is a Swiss keynote speaker, global environmental adventurer, and "Solar Pioneer".

Life
Louis Palmer was raised in Luzern, Switzerland. Since he was a little child, his dream was to show the benefit of renewable energy sources and solar cars to the world. After finishing school, he became a schoolteacher. After several trips to foreign countries, he discovered his vision and took his first steps into Solar Energy. In 2007 and 2008, he was the first to circumnavigate the globe on solar power.

Motivational speaker
Louis Palmer is a motivational speaker at conferences worldwide. He speaks about his vision of solar energy and about his dream of a better world with renewable energy. His experience as a teacher is part of his special way of communicating to people. As a conference speaker, he has had the opportunity to speak to audiences of researchers, politicians, and students. This part of educating the audience and inspiring people to change their consumption behaviour into a reflected awareness of the environment is of great importance to him. In 2009, Palmer was awarded the European Solar Prize, and in 2011, he was awarded Champion of the Earth for his achievements.

Solartaxi
In 2004, with the help of sponsors and technical support, Palmer began building a solar-powered car called the Solartaxi. For the technical expertise, he worked together with the Hochschule für Technik und Architektur Luzern and three other Swiss universities. He drove around the world in his Solartaxi between 2007 and 2008, logging over 54,000 kilometers through over 40 counties. In 2008, the tour ended in Luzern after 18 months, making it the first tour around the world in a solar-powered car. During the tour his companion Erik Schmitt made a documentary film about the tour. In 2009 he was awarded the European Solar Prize for his Solartaxi.

Zero Race
After his Solartaxi tour, Palmer drew from his previous experience when he became the initiator and tour director of an organized race. The Zero Emissions Race took place between August 2010 and February 2011. The aim was to make it around the world in 80 days and to show what emission-free vehicles can accomplish. Palmer invited four teams to enter the competition, setting vehicle criteria that were quite concrete: They had to be propelled by an electric motor, they had to be able to drive a certain distance in a certain time, and they had to be able to carry at least two passengers. Through Zero Emissions Race, Palmer was once again able to draw attention to his vision of sustainable living.

WAVE World Advanced Vehicle Expedition
Pamer's third tour began on 10 September 2011 in Paris and finished on 25 September 2011 in Prague. 25 electric vehicles from eight countries joined his first WAVE across 3,000 km and eight countries. The tour stopped in around 30 cities to demonstrate to the public that electric vehicles are reliable, fun, and powerful. All vehicles had to produce their own electricity from a renewable source such as wind or solar and feed it into the grid. In December, the second WAVE took place in India. Five electric cars joined this tour from Mumbai to Bangalore and back. In 2014, 75 vehicles have already joined the tour, and Palmer set the world record for the largest electric vehicle parade with 481 vehicles, which joined the WAVE at its start in Stuttgart on May 31, 2014.

Switchbus / Switzerland Explorer
Together with his wife, Dr. Julianna Priskin, Palmer co-founded the Switzerland Explorer" with the world's first 100% electric tour bus. The aim of Switzerland Explorer is to take groups or individual tourists on sustainable tours around Switzerland. The bus was originally in service for the German army, and then it was converted to electric drive by Design-werk. It can transport up to 16 passengers and has a range of up to 300 km.

Writings
 Verrückt nach dieser Welt: Abenteuer zwischen Himmel und Erde. Delius Klasing Verlag. Bielefeld. 2005.

References

External links
 
 Louis Palmer's biography – on his personal website
 Solartaxi. Around the world with the sun – website promoting the film by Erik Schmitt
 WAVE World Advanced Vehicle Expeditions 2011 – about the WAVE Europe and WAVE India
 WAVE World Advanced Vehicle Expeditions 2012 – about the E-Bike WAVE and WAVE Europe in September 2012
 WAVE World Advanced Vehicle Expeditions – about the world's largest electric vehicle tour
 UNEP Champion of the Earth Award - about Louis Palmer as Lauretae
 Switzerland Explorer - Sustainable tours around Switzerland - about the tours aboard the world's first 100% electric tour bus

1971 births
Living people
People from Lucerne
Solar car racing
21st-century Swiss inventors